Joe DeLong is an American politician who served as a Democratic member of the West Virginia House of Delegates, representing the 1st District from 2000 to 2008. He held the position of Majority Leader of the House of Delegates from 2006 to 2008. In 2008 he decided to forgo re-election to the House and ran an unsuccessful primary campaign for West Virginia Secretary of State. Joe DeLong is the son of Teresa (Manypenny) DeLong and Robert Delong, of New Cumberland, WV.

External links
West Virginia Legislature - Delegate Joe DeLong official government website
Project Vote Smart - Representative Joe DeLong (WV) profile
Follow the Money - Joe DeLong
2008 2006 2004 2002 2000 campaign contributions

People from Weirton, West Virginia
Members of the West Virginia House of Delegates
1972 births
Living people
21st-century American politicians